Lukas Osele (born 30 September 1997) is an Italian badminton player. He competed at the 2018 Mediterranean Games, and won the men's doubles bronze medal partnered with Kevin Strobl.

Career 
In 2016, he became the runner-up of Ethiopia International tournament in men's doubles event.

Achievements

Mediterranean Games 
Men's doubles

BWF International Challenge/Series 
Men's doubles

  BWF International Challenge tournament
  BWF International Series tournament
  BWF Future Series tournament

References

External links 
 
 

1997 births
Living people
Sportspeople from Bolzano
Italian male badminton players
Mediterranean Games bronze medalists for Italy
Competitors at the 2018 Mediterranean Games
Mediterranean Games medalists in badminton